Vladimir Petrovich Zamansky (born 6 February 1926) is a Soviet and Russian stage and film actor. People's Artist of the RSFSR (1989).

Biography
As a boy, Zamansky grew up without a father, and in 1941, when the Germans entered Kremenchuk, he was left without a mother. Deceiving the commission and adding to his age, he joined the Russian Army and volunteered to go to the front. In the winter of 1942 he became a student of the Tashkent Polytechnic, Communications, and in 1943 he was drafted into the Red Army. He fought from May 1944, and in one occasion saved his commander from their burning M10 Wolverine. In June 1944 he served as a radio operator in 1223th self-propelled artillery regiment of the 3rd Belarusian Front during a breakthrough near Orsha. As part of the regiment with a short break due to injury he served until the end of the war. After the war, as part of a military unit p / n 74256 in the Northern Group of Forces (Poland) he continued to serve in the Soviet Army.

In 1950, for participating in the beating of a platoon commander he was sentenced by the Military Tribunal to nine years imprisonment under article 193-B of the Criminal Code of the RSFSR. Among other prisoners he worked on construction sites in Kharkov, Moscow University building. For high-altitude life-threatening operation his prison term was reduced. He was released in 1954. After the amnesty, for admission to theater school.

In 1958, he graduated from the Moscow Art Theatre School (course Gerasimov). From 1958–1966, he was an actor in the Moscow theater Sovremennik Theatre. From 1972–1980 years, he was a theatre-studio movie actor, and, since 1992 he was at the theater Yermolova.

He is married to actress Natalia Klimova.

In 1998, Vladimir Zamansky retired and he and his wife settled in Murom, where they currently live.

Selected filmography

 1960 —  Lullaby as Andrey Petryanu
 1961 —  The Steamroller and the Violin as road worker Sergei
 1962 —  In the Seven Winds as Vladimir Vasiliev, the company commander
 1969 —  The Death of Wazir Mukhtar as Maltsev, secretary Griboyedov
 1970 —  Liberation as Pavel Batov
 1970 —  The Flight as Baev
 1971 —  Trial on the Road as Alexander Lazarev
 1972 —  Solaris as Kris Kelvin (voice, role played by Donatas Banionis)
 1972 —  At the Сorner of Arbat Street Bubulinas as Vlad
 1974 —  Departure Delayed as Sergey Bakchenin
 1976 —  The Life and Death of Ferdinand Luce as Ferdinand Luce, director (voice)
 1977 —  Eternal Call as Fyodor Nechayev
 1977 —  In the Zone of Special Attention as colonel
 1979  —  The Gypsy as Privalov
 1979 —  Allegro s ognyom as Ivankov
 1979 —  Stalker as Professor's telephone interlocutor
 1980 —  The Melody in Two Voices as Nikolai Pavlovich
 1980 —  Do Not Shoot at White Swans as Mikhail Matveyevich, tourist
 1983 —  The Shore as Zykin
 1987 —  Mournful Unconcern as Mazzini
 1987 —  Tomorrow Was the War as Lyubertsy
 1988 —  Days of Eclipse as Snegovoy
 1991 —  100 Days Before the Command as The Unknown Man
 1997 —  The Botanical Garden as Pyotr Nikolayevich

Awards and honors 

 Medal "For Courage" (1945)
 Honored Artist of the RSFSR (1974)
 Order of the Patriotic War, 2nd class (1985)
 USSR State Prize (1988)
 People's Artist of the RSFSR (1989)
 Order of Honour (2009)
 Order of Alexander Nevsky (2021)
 Medal of Zhukov

References

External links
 
 Brief biography

1926 births
Living people
20th-century Russian male actors
People from Kremenchuk
Moscow Art Theatre School alumni
Honored Artists of the RSFSR
People's Artists of the RSFSR
Recipients of the Medal "For Courage" (Russia)
Recipients of the Medal of Zhukov
Recipients of the Order of Honour (Russia)
Recipients of the USSR State Prize
Russian male film actors
Russian male voice actors
Soviet male film actors
Soviet male voice actors
Soviet people of World War II